Kakuri is a residential area in Nigeria. It is a suburb of Kaduna and is under the Kaduna South Local Government. 
It has a St. Gerard Hospital and a Gwamna Awan General Hospital. A Government Secondary School, a school of psychiatric nursing and St. Anne's Nursery and Primary School as well Victory Academy, 2nd ECWA secondary school and Excel College. 
 

It does not have a railway station. It is the centre of Kaduna's industry. Nigerian-German Chemicals PLC, Prosan Engineering, Peugeot Automobile Nigeria and Chanchangi Motors Ltd. are active in Kakuri. Christ Apostolic Church and St. Paul's Anglican Church are present in Kakuri. is present there, too. Kakuri also has a Government Secondary School. Matthew Kukah, then-Vicar General of the Catholic Diocese of Kaduna lives in Kakuri and now bishop of Sokoto. former president of Nigeria Olusegun Obasanjo has worked in the armed forces in Kakuri. Chief Omadachi Egboche former Chairman Licensed Electrical contractor Association of Nigeria (LECAN Kakuri branch) was a Resident. Areas surrounding Kakuri include the Nassarawa to the north, Trikania to the west, Barnawa to the east and Gonigora to tho south. Kakuri has a Developmental Association for Renewable Energies.

References

Slums in Nigeria
Kaduna